Pseudotalopia is a genus of sea snails, marine gastropod mollusks in the subfamily Cantharidinae of the family Trochidae, the top snails.

Species
Species within the genus Pseudotalopia include:
 Pseudotalopia fernandrikae Vilvens, 2005
 Pseudotalopia rainesi Poppe, Tagaro & Goto, 2018
 Pseudotalopia sakuraii Habe, 1961
 Pseudotalopia taiwanensis (Chen, 2006)

References

 Habe T. (1961). Coloured illustrations of the shells of Japan (II). Hoikusha, Osaka. xii + 183 + 42 pp., 66 pls.

External links
 Williams S.T., Kano Y., Warén A. & Herbert D.G. (2020). Marrying molecules and morphology: first steps towards a reevaluation of solariellid genera (Gastropoda: Trochoidea) in the light of molecular phylogenetic studies. Journal of Molluscan Studies. 86(1): 1–26

 
Trochidae
Gastropod genera